The following ships of the Indian Navy have been named Mysore:

 was formerly the  HMS Nigeria acquired in 1957 from the Royal Navy and stricken in 1985
 a  launched in 1993

Indian Navy ship names